A  saddle roof is a roof form which follows a convex curve about one axis and a concave curve about the other.  The hyperbolic paraboloid form has been used for roofs at various times since it is easily constructed from straight sections of lumber, steel, or other conventional materials.  The term is used because the form resembles the shape of a saddle.

Sometimes referred to as a hypar, the saddle roof may also be formed as a tensegrity structure.

Mathematically, a saddle shape contains at least one saddle point.

The historical meaning is a synonym for a gable roof particularly a dual-pitched roof on a tower,  also called a pack-saddle roof.

Gallery

See also
 eight hyperbolic parabolas rise to form the roof of Cathedral of Saint Mary of the Assumption and St. Mary's Cathedral, Tokyo.
 Hyperboloid structure
 List of hyperboloid structures
 Metro San Lázaro
 Xavier University

References

External links
 Kansas State Historical Society newsletter featuring house with hyperbolic paraboloid roof.
 George Watson College, Edinburgh. Music auditorium

Architectural elements
Roofs